Louis Patrick Francis (May 24, 1923 - March 9, 1968) served in the California State Assembly for the 25th district. During World War II he served in the United States Navy.

Pinole, California has a park named for Louis Francis.

References

United States Navy personnel of World War II
Republican Party members of the California State Assembly
1923 births
1968 deaths
Politicians from Oakland, California